Msasani is an administrative ward in the Kinondoni District of the Dar es Salaam Region of Tanzania. The ward is located north west of Dar es Salaam central business district. According to the 2002 census, the ward has a total population of 43,457.

The ward is geographically a peninsula; both the ward and the peninsula are named after the Msasani village, which used to be the only settlement in the area.  The intense urbanization of the area in recent times notwithstanding, it is still essentially a Swahili fishermen's village.

Msasani includes some of the wealthiest areas in the Dar es Salaam Region, Peninsula, Oysterbay and Masaki. These areas contain shops, restaurants, beauty salons, pubs, and other entertainment facilities, as well as a large bazaar selling local crafts at Slipway hotel/mall. It is also a luxury residential area, with several large villas owned by members of the Tanzanian political and economic elite. Most of these structures were built in an era of building liberalization initiated by former President of Tanzania Mr. Ali Hassan Mwinyi.

Public transportation in the area is mainly provided by daladalas, their main end stations being Msasani on Kimweri Avenue and Masaki near the Sea Cliff Hotel. From Slipway, motored dhows provide connection to the island of Bongoyo.

Coco Beach in Msasani is a popular holiday and weekend destination for Dar es Salaam inhabitants, although shark attacks were reported several years ago.

Embassies hosted in Msasani

Msasani hosts the Embassy of the United States of America.

See also
Historic Swahili Settlements

References

Swahili people
Swahili city-states
Swahili culture
Kinondoni District
Wards of Dar es Salaam Region